Darbandan (also Romanized as Darbandān) is a village in Khir Rural District, Runiz District, Estahban County, Fars Province, Iran. At the 2006 census, its population was 118, in 28 families.

References 

Populated places in Estahban County